Shark Island may refer to:

Places
Cocos Island, Costa Rica
Shark Island, Namibia, off the coast of Namibia 
Shark Island Concentration Camp, at Shark Island, Namibia
Shark Island (Port Jackson), in Sydney Harbour, Australia
Shark Island (Cronulla Beach), a semi-tidal rock ledge and bodyboarding spot in Sydney, Australia
Tiburón Island, literally Shark Island, in the gulf of California, Mexico
Shark Island, County Down, a townland in County Down, Northern Ireland
Inishark, also called Shark Island, off the coast of County Galway, Ireland

Other uses
Shark Island (band), 1980s rock band from Los Angeles
Shark Island, an album released in 1983 by electronic band Basking Sharks

See also
The Prisoner of Shark Island, a 1936 film